Gordon Bruce Balfour (December 25, 1882 – July 31, 1949) was a Canadian rower who competed in the 1908 Summer Olympics. He was the bowman of the Canadian boat, which won the bronze medal in the coxless four. He was also a crew member of the Canadian boat, which won the bronze medal in the men's eight.

Balfour graduated from Osgoode Hall Law School in 1909 and later served in the Canadian Field Artillery in World War I.

References

External links
Gordon Balfour's profile at databaseOlympics

1882 births
1949 deaths
Canadian male rowers
Medalists at the 1908 Summer Olympics
Olympic rowers of Canada
Olympic bronze medalists for Canada
Olympic medalists in rowing
Rowers at the 1908 Summer Olympics
20th-century Canadian people